Rui Miguel Guerra Pires (born 22 March 1998) is a Portuguese professional footballer who plays as a midfielder for Primeira Liga side Paços de Ferreira.

Club career
On 7 August 2016, Pires made his professional debut with FC Porto B in a 2016–17 LigaPro match against Aves.

On 9 July 2019, Pires moved on a free transfer to Ligue 2 side Troyes AC. In December 2019, he suffered anterior cruciate ligament injury ending his season prematurely. He ended up making 13 appearances.

On 26 July 2021, he returned to Portugal and joined Paços de Ferreira on loan.

Honours
Individual
 UEFA European Under-19 Championship Team of the Tournament: 2017

References

External links

Stats and profile at LPFP 
National team data 

1998 births
Living people
People from Mirandela
Sportspeople from Bragança District
Portuguese footballers
Portugal youth international footballers
Association football midfielders
FC Porto B players
ES Troyes AC players
F.C. Paços de Ferreira players
Liga Portugal 2 players
Ligue 2 players
Primeira Liga players
Portuguese expatriate footballers
Expatriate footballers in France
Portuguese expatriate sportspeople in France